Return to Action is a 1990 Hong Kong action film produced and directed by Chen Kuan-tai and starring Alex Man, Rosamund Kwan, Mark Cheng, Shing Fui-On and Chen himself in a supporting role.

Plot
Chan Wan-sing (Chen Kuan-tai) has retired from the underworld for many years and often inculcates his son Wah (Mark Cheng), hoping that his son will not step into his footsteps. However, Wah had secretly colluded with Mad Man (Shing Fui-On) in dealing with illegal business. While on the other hand, Chan greatly cares for his adopted daughter Joey (Rosamund Kwan) as if she was his biological child and is also very proud of Joey's husband, police inspector Man Yung-keung (Alex Man) of the Regional Unit of Hong Kong.

Man's superiors assign him to assist Interpol officer Ms. Hon (Lee Siu-man), who has come to Hong Kong to investigate smuggling case, and ensure her safety. However, Ms. Hon disapproves of the Hong Kong Police and starts the operation by herself, where she was captured and murdered by Wah.

When Joey brings her students to visit her brother's shipyard, she notices a female corpse in photo that was taken during the visit. When she questions Wah about the corpse, he denies it and destroys the photo. To repay Chan's favor of raising her, Joey did not bring this matter up with Man. However, this decision has led her to a fatal disaster when Wah brings Mad Man to ask her for the negative of the photo. When she refused, Wah accidentally kills her. After Joey died, the negative had unexpectedly fallen into the hands of Man. In order to avenge Joey, Man teams up with Chan to find Wah and Mad Man. During an intense battle, Chan punishes his own relations in the cause of justice, and shoots his son dead in order to save Man.

Cast
Alex Man as Man Yung-keung
Rosamund Kwan as Joey Chan
Mark Cheng as Wah
Shing Fui-On as Mad Man
Chen Kuan-tai as Chan Wan-sing
Lee Yiu-man as Ms. Hon
Eliza Yue
Kenneth Tsang as Officer Ng
Cheng Kang-yeh as Suspect in police station
Yue Tau-wan as Cross-eyed cop
Dion Lam as On
Tai Po as Man's informer (cameo)
Lo Lieh as Prisoner (cameo)
Wilson Tong as Prisoner (cameo)
Wong Chi-wai as Mad Man's bodyguard
Yat Poon-chai as Rocky
Chan Chik-wai as Yip
Thomas Sin as Prisoner
Mai Kei as Suspect in police station
Chow Mei-fung
Sin Kwai-chi
Gabriel Wong as Joey's student
Yu Mo-lin as Mother scolding her kid
Leung Wing-yim
Chang Sing-kwong as Bodyguard
Chung Wing as Prisoner
Chow Chi-hung as Bodyguard
Lee Yiu-king as Guard
Lau Shung-fung
Lung Ying
Fei Pak
Ling Chi-hung

Reception

Critical
So Good Reviews gave the film a mixed review and writes "Standard and rather cheaply made, Chen Kuan-tai nonetheless delivers the beats of the narrative fairly well."

Box office
The film grossed HK$2,340,415 at the Hong Kong box office during its theatrical run from 29 March to 4 April 1990 in Hong Kong.

References

External links

Return to Action at Hong Kong Cinemagic

1990 films
1990 action films
1990 martial arts films
Hong Kong action films
Hong Kong martial arts films
Gun fu films
Triad films
Police detective films
1990s Cantonese-language films
Films set in Hong Kong
Films shot in Hong Kong
Hong Kong films about revenge
1990s Hong Kong films